Ban Hinlat  is a fishing village in Mounlapamok District, Champasak Province, in southern Laos. It is near the border with Cambodia.

References

External links
Maplandia

Populated places in Champasak Province